Dovzhansky is a land border crossing between Ukraine and Russia on the Ukrainian side, in the town of Dovzhansky, Sverdlovsk city municipality, Luhansk Oblast.

The crossing is situated on autoroute . Across the border on the Russian side is the city of Novoshakhtinsk, Rostov Oblast.  The outskirts of Novoshakhtinsk is 10 km from the border crossing and the city center is 20 km.

The type of crossing is automobile, status - international. The types of transportation for automobile crossings are passenger and freight. Trains traveling between Sverdlovsk and Novoshakhtinsk pass through the railway border crossing at Dovzhansky, too.

The port of entry, "Dolzhanskiy", is part of the Dovzhansky customs post of Luhansk customs. Code checkpoint - 70207 02 00 (11)

War in Donbas
On May 14, 2014, one day after the unrecognized declaration of independence by the Lugansk People's Republic (LPR), Ukrainian border guards at the Dovzhansky border crossing arrested Valery Bolotov.  150 to 200 armed Russian backed separatists attacked the Dovzhansky checkpoint where he had been held and freed him.

Closing the crossing
On June 5, 2014, the Cabinet of Ministers of Ukraine closed this border checkpoint and seven others on the Russia–Ukraine border. At that time, separatists in eastern Ukraine had control of the border crossing allowing weapons from Russia to pass without controls. Subsequently, on July 1, 2014, the Ukrainian army regained control of this border point, until 1 August, where daily "Grad" rocket volleys and shelling by pro-Russian forces made the Ukrainian position untenable.

See also
 Russo-Ukrainian War
 Russia–Ukraine border
 State Border of Ukraine
 Highway M03 (Ukraine)

References

External links
 State Border Guard of Ukraine website 
 Пункти пропуску на кордоні із Росією — Державна прикордонна служба (English: Checkpoints on the Border with Russia) from The State Border Service website 

Russia–Ukraine border crossings
Luhansk Oblast
Geography of Luhansk Oblast
War in Donbas